Vögele is a German surname. Notable people with the surname include:

Guido Vögele (born 1937), Swiss long-distance runner
Stefanie Vögele (born 1990), Swiss tennis player

See also
 Voegele
 Vogel (surname)

German-language surnames